Jesus, son of Fabus, also known as Jesus, son of Phabet, Jesus son of Phiabi or Joshua ben Fabus, was a Jewish High priest (c. 30 – 23 BCE) in the 1st century BCE. 

He succeeded Ananelus and was removed by Herod when he appointed his father-in-law, Simon ben Boethus, to the high-priesthood.

References

1st-century BCE High Priests of Israel